This is a list of national parks in Bangladesh.

List

References 

Bangladesh
National parks